Dillen is a Dutch surname, and is a variant of the Breton word Dillon and means faithful. Notable people with the surname include:

Coen Dillen (1926–1990), Dutch footballer
Jacques Dillen (1903–?), Belgian wrestler
Karel Dillen (1925–2007), Belgian politician
Ken Dillen (1938–2020), Canadian politician
René Dillen (born 1951), Belgian racing cyclist

See also
Dillens